Radio Livno is a Bosnian local public radio station, broadcasting from Livno, Bosnia and Herzegovina.

The estimated number of potential listeners is around 59,480.

Radio Livno was launched on 24 May 1980 by the municipal council of Livno. In Yugoslavia and in SR Bosnia and Herzegovina, it was a local/municipal Radio Sarajevo network affiliate. Radio Livno's programs are mainly produced in Croatian. This radio station broadcasts a variety of programs such as music, local news, and talk shows. Due to its favorable geographical position in the Canton 10 region, this radio station is also available in neighboring Croatia.

Frequencies
The program is currently broadcast at 3 frequencies:

 Livno and Bosansko Grahovo 
 Ivovik - Tomislavgrad, Šujica, Kupres, Glamoč 
 Livno - Batinića brdo

See also 
List of radio stations in Bosnia and Herzegovina

References

External links 
 www.radiolivno.ba
 Communications Regulatory Agency of Bosnia and Herzegovina

Livno
Radio stations established in 1980

Mass media in Livno